Stormspell Records is an independent record label from California, United States, founded in San Jose in 2006.

Policy 
Stormspell specializes in 1980's classic heavy metal/speed metal/thrash metal limited re-issues, although they represent all rock and metal genres as well.

The label works with bands from around the world but mainly in the US. Their selling coverage is also worldwide.

Artists 
Anacrusis (US)
Blazon Stone (Sweden)
Blood Curse (US)
Captain Trips (Australia)
Claymorean (Serbia)
Cloven Altar (US)
DarkBlack (US)
Deadlyforce (Portugal)
Diamond Plate (US)
Fallen Order (New Zealand)
Fischel's Beast (US)
Forgotten Legacy (US)
Grave Cross (Mexico)
Hessian (US)
Leather Heart (Spain)
Narval (Puerto Rico)
Owl (US)
Rocka Rollas (Sweden)
Sacred Guardian (Puerto Rico)
Steel Aggressor (US)
Sylent Storm (US)
Skull & Bones (Argentina)
Terminus (United Kingdom)
Timeless Haunt (US)
Outer Limits (Japan)

External links 
 Official website

References 

American independent record labels